Orocrambus vittellus is a moth in the family Crambidae. It was described by Henry Doubleday in 1843.
 It is endemic to New Zealand.  This species has been recorded in the North and South Islands, as well as Stewart Island. It prefers a habitat that consists of grasslands.

The wingspan is 19–28 mm. Adults have been recorded on wing from November to April.

The larvae feed on Agrostis tenuis and probably other grasses.

References

Crambinae
Moths described in 1843
Moths of New Zealand
Endemic fauna of New Zealand
Taxa named by Henry Doubleday
Endemic moths of New Zealand